Majid Qodiri (Kadyrov) ('Abd-ul-Majid-khan, son of 'Abd-ul-Qodir-khan (Kadyrov), (Мажид Қодирий) (October 2, 1886, Qori-Yoghdi Mahalla, Sheyhantahur daha, Tashkent — October 5, 1938, Tashkent) was an Uzbek literary scholar, public figure, and publicist  who was the author of the first Uzbek tutorials and textbooks of literature, history, and arithmethi.  He was one of the founders of Jadidism in Turkestan.

References

19th-century Uzbekistani writers
Uzbekistani academics
1938 deaths
1886 births
Soviet writers
Uzbekistani male writers
Writers from Tashkent
People from Syr-Darya Oblast